Dendrolobium triangulare is a species of flowering plants in the legume family, Fabaceae. It is found in Taiwan, China, Cambodia, India, Laos, Malaysia, Myanmar, Nepal, Sri Lanka, Thailand, Vietnam and few African countries. Leaves are trifoliate, where blade narrowly obovo-elliptic. Flowers white or pale yellow. Seed elliptic. Roots of the plant are widely used for medicinal purposes to strengthen bones and build muscle.

References

A novel azo-type compound from Dendrolobium triangulare
New Distributional Records to the Flora of Andaman and Nicobar Islands.

triangulare
Flora of China
Flora of tropical Asia